Bader Mohammed Yousef Munshi (born 22 June 1999) is a Saudi Arabian professional footballer who plays as a midfielder for Pro League side Damac.

Career
Munshi started his career at the youth team of Al-Ahli. He arrived for the first team in 2018. on October 31, 2020 Munshi left Al-Ahli and joined MBS League side Al-Kawkab, on January 28, 2021 Munshi left Al-Kawkab and joined Pro League side Damac.

References

External links 
 

1999 births
Living people
Saudi Arabian footballers
Saudi Arabia youth international footballers
Saudi Arabia international footballers
Al-Ahli Saudi FC players
Al-Kawkab FC players
Damac FC players
Saudi Professional League players
Saudi First Division League players
Association football midfielders